Akademia Futsal Club are a Polish futsal club based in Pniewy.

Squad

Goalkeepers

Other Players

Honours
1 Futsal Cup of Polonia: 2009

External links
Official Website

Futsal clubs in Poland
Szamotuły County
Sport in Greater Poland Voivodeship
Futsal clubs established in 1999
1999 establishments in Poland